Meadow Lemon III (April 25, 1932 – December 27, 2015), known professionally as Meadowlark Lemon, was an American basketball player, actor, and Christian minister (ordained in 1986). Beginning in 1994, he ran Meadowlark Lemon Ministries in Scottsdale, Arizona. For 22 years, he was known as the "Clown Prince" of the touring Harlem Globetrotters basketball team. He played in more than 16,000 games for the Globetrotters and was a 2003 inductee into the Naismith Memorial Basketball Hall of Fame.

When basketball legend Wilt Chamberlain was asked his opinion on the best player of all time, he responded, "For me it would be Meadowlark Lemon." Fellow Wilmington great Michael Jordan called Lemon a "true national treasure" and a personal inspiration in Jordan's youth.

Early life
Lemon was born in Wilmington, North Carolina and attended Williston Industrial School, graduating in 1952. He then matriculated at Florida A&M University, but was soon drafted into the United States Army and served for two years in Austria and West Germany.

Career

Basketball
Lemon made his first basketball hoop out of an onion sack and coat hanger, using an empty Carnation milk can to sink his first 2-point hoop.

Lemon first applied to the Globetrotters in 1954 at age 22, finally being chosen to play in 1955. In 1980, he left to form one of his Globetrotters imitators, the Bucketeers. He played with that team until 1983, then moved on to play with the Shooting Stars from 1984 to 1987. In 1988, he moved on to "Meadowlark Lemon's Harlem All Stars" team. Despite being with his own touring team, Lemon returned to the Globetrotters, playing 50 games with them in 1994.

In 2000, Lemon received the John Bunn Award, the highest honor given by the Naismith Memorial Basketball Hall of Fame outside induction. He was inducted into the Naismith Memorial Basketball Hall of Fame in 2003.

Television appearances
In the 1970s, an animated version of Lemon, voiced by Scatman Crothers, starred with various other Globetrotters in the Hanna-Barbera animated cartoon series Harlem Globetrotters, as well as its spinoff, The Super Globetrotters. The animated Globetrotters also made three appearances in The New Scooby-Doo Movies.

Lemon appeared alongside Fred "Curly" Neal, Marques Haynes and his other fellow Globetrotters in a live-action Saturday-morning television show, The Harlem Globetrotters Popcorn Machine, in 1974–1975, which also featured Rodney Allen Rippy and Avery Schreiber.

In 1978, Lemon appeared in a memorable Burger King commercial by making a tower of burgers until he found a double-beef pickles and onions with no-cheese burger.

in 1979, Lemon guest-starred in an episode of the NBC television anthology series $weepstake$.

In 1980, Lemon appeared as the coach of the basketball team from The White Shadow in a series of guest skits for Order/Disorder week on 3-2-1 Contact.

In 1983, Lemon appeared on an episode of Alice entitled "Tommy Fouls Out", and in a Charmin toilet paper commercial alongside Mr. Whipple (actor Dick Wilson).

In 1996 season 2 episode 5 of Pinky and the Brain titled "Brain's Song" Meadowlark Lemon was Brain's best friend in the parody of Brian's Song.

In 2006, on episode of adult swim's The Boondocks entitled "The Itis", the name of Meadowlark was used as the name of the park that Ed Wuncler I mentions an interest in purchasing from the state.

In 2009, on FOX's TV show The Cleveland Show, the name of Meadowlark Lemon was used for a dog's name, a pet for the character of Rallo Tubbs. The dog died in the second episode.

Other work
In 1979, Lemon starred in the educational geography film Meadowlark Lemon Presents the World. Also in 1979, he joined the cast of the short-lived television sitcom Hello, Larry in season two, to help boost the show's ratings. In the same year, he played Rev. Grady Jackson in the movie The Fish That Saved Pittsburgh. It was several years before he actually became an ordained minister himself.

He recorded a song, "My Kids" which was written by Dalton & Dubarri. The song was produced by Dubarri, and released on Casablanca NB 969 in March, 1979. In The Cash Box Singles to Watch section, it was called Top 40 material by the reviewer.

In 1982, Lemon was featured in the Grammy-nominated video Fun & Games, an interactive educational video produced by Optical Programming Associates and Scholastic Productions, on the then-emerging LaserDisc format.

In 1994, Lemon was referenced in an episode of the Nickelodeon show “The Adventures of Pete & Pete”. One of the characters claimed that “...you know, in a matter of moments, we’re all gonna be famous like Meadowlark Lemon.”

Personal life
Lemon had 10 children: Richard, George, Beverly, Donna, Robin, Jonathan, Jamison, Angela, Crystal, and Caleb.

A born-again Christian, Lemon became an ordained minister in 1986 and received a Doctor of Divinity degree from Vision International University in Ramona, California, in 1988. He was also featured as a gospel singer in several Gaither Homecoming videos. In his last years, he took up residence in Scottsdale, where his Meadowlark Lemon Ministries, Inc. is located.

Death
Lemon died in Scottsdale, on December 27, 2015, at the age of 83. No cause of death was given.

References

External links

 
 
 Profile at Harlem Globetrotters official website 
 

1932 births
2015 deaths
African-American basketball players
African-American Christian clergy
American Christian clergy
Basketball players from North Carolina
Florida A&M University alumni
Harlem Globetrotters players
Naismith Memorial Basketball Hall of Fame inductees
Sportspeople from Wilmington, North Carolina
United States Army soldiers 
American men's basketball players
20th-century African-American sportspeople
21st-century African-American people